Electric Cloud, Inc. was a privately held, DevOps software company based in San Jose, CA. Founded in 2002, Electric Cloud was a provider of application release orchestration (ARO) tools, automating release pipelines and managing application life cycles. Electric Cloud's products included ElectricFlow and ElectricAccelerator.

In April 2019, CloudBees acquired Electric Cloud and integrated Electric Cloud products into its own portfolio.

History 
Electric Cloud was founded on April 29, 2002 by John Ousterhout, the creator of Tcl, and John Graham-Cumming. In November 2002, Electric Cloud released its first product, ElectricAccelerator. In November 2006, ElectricCommander was released. In June 2014, ElectricCommander became the foundation for the orchestration platform called ElectricFlow.

In October 2014, Electric Cloud partnered with author and DevOps specialist Gene Kim to co-found the DevOps Enterprise Summit. The conferenced focuses on agile, continuous delivery, and DevOps transformations within enterprise companies.

In October 2017, Carmine Napolitano, formerly Electric Cloud's CFO, was appointed CEO.

In 2018, Electric Cloud received the highest scores for three out of three use cases as defined in Gartner’s 2018 Critical Capabilities for Application Release Orchestration.

Prior to its acquisition, Electric Cloud raised $64.6 million from US Venture Partners, Siemens Venture Capital, Mayfield Fund, RRE Ventures, Rembrandt Venture Partners, and other investors.

Acquisition by CloudBees 
In April 2019, CloudBees acquired Electric Cloud.Terms of the deal were not disclosed.

See also 
 Application release automation
 BuildMaster
 ccache
 distcc
 IncrediBuild
 Inedo
 List of build automation software
 Multi-stage continuous integration
 XebiaLabs

References 

Compiling tools
Software companies based in California
Software companies established in 2002
Companies based in Sunnyvale, California
2002 establishments in California
Privately held companies based in California
Defunct software companies of the United States